Vicuña Mackenna is a station on the Santiago Metro in Santiago, Chile. It is a transfer station between the Line 4 and the Line 4A and is the eastern terminus of the Line 4A. The Line 4 station was opened on 2 March 2006 as part of the connection between Grecia and  Vicente Valdés. The Line 4A station was opened on 16 August 2006 as part of the inaugural section of the line between Vicuña Mackenna and La Cisterna.

The station is composed of a street-level mezzanine, an embanked level, which is located along Vespucio Sur Freeway, and an underground level. The lower level was originally designed to serve both lines as a kind of branch for the would-be Line 4A, but it currently only serves Line 4. The embankment has a temporary platform that overlaps one of the original tracks.

References

Santiago Metro stations
Railway stations opened in 2006
Santiago Metro Line 4
Santiago Metro Line 4A